"Paper Light (Higher)" is a song by Swedish singer Loreen. The song was released in Sweden as a digital download on 5 March 2015. The song was written by Loreen Talhaoui, Tom Liljegren and Alexander "Alex" Ryberg and produced by Liljegren and Ryberg. The song has peaked at number 25 on the Swedish Singles Chart.

Background
The song was written by Loreen Talhaoui, Tom Liljegren and Alexander "Alex" Ryberg and produced by Liljegren and Ryberg.

Release
During Loreen's visit in Montenegro in July 2014, she announced that her new album will be probably released in October 2014. She performed at the Celebration of Budva Tourist Organization and the National Day event at the Jaz Beach in Budva. During an interview with Prva.rs, she says: "The new album is coming out in October and after that there will be a lot of touring. It's very different from "Euphoria", it's a lot dirtier and more hip-hop." During a performance at Eurovision Gala Night at the Casino Luxembourg in Luxembourg, she confirmed that the single of her new album coming soon in March 2015. On 27 February, it was announced that Loreen's new single "Paper Light (Higher)" was released on 5 March 2015 in Scandinavia and was released worldwide on 9 March 2015.

Live performances
On 20 September 2014, Loreen premiered the song at Eurasian Music Awards at the Central Stadium in Almaty, Kazakhstan. In January 2015, she also premiered the song during the Eurovision Gala Night at the Casino Luxembourg in Luxembourg. Loreen performed as interval act during the Second Chance round of Melodifestivalen 2015 on 7 March singing the lead single off of Paperlight, "Paper Light (Higher)". On 30 April, Loreen performed "Paper Light (Higher)" during 7th Humorgalan UNICEF's telethon in Sweden. During the Eurovision Song Contest 2015, Loreen headlined the Vienna Life Ball, Europe's biggest charity event supporting people with HIV and AIDS in Austria, attending the event in a dress designed by Jean Paul Gaultier and performed "Paper Light (Higher)". On 23 May 2015, Loreen performed "Paper Light (Higher)" onstage at Cirkus in Helsinki as the headline act during the city's annual The Eurovision Party, celebrating the Eurovision Song Contest. One day later, she performed the song during Childhood-dagen at Gröna Lund in Stockholm, Sweden.

Track listing

Chart performance

Weekly charts

Release history

Paper Light (Revisited)
A remixed version of "Paper Light" premiered on Spotify on 17 April 2015. It was produced by Salvatore Ganacci and titled "Paper Light (Revisited)". The official video was released on YouTube on 7 May 2015.

References

2015 songs
2015 singles
Loreen (singer) songs
Warner Music Group singles